Jeremy Robert "Jim" Fox OBE (born 19 September 1941) is a British modern pentathlete and Olympic champion.

Career
Fox is one of the most influential figures in the development of the Modern Pentathlon in Britain. He won the British title a record ten times and is the only British pentathlete to have competed in four Olympic Games. His fourth place in the individual event at Munich in 1972 was the best placing by a Briton up to that time. It was only subsequently matched by Richard Phelps in 1984, and surpassed in 2021 by Joe Choong who won gold in Tokyo. Fox made his Olympic début in 1964, when he placed 29th in the individual event, and in his second Olympic appearance in 1968 he improved to finish eighth.

After the 1968 Games, Fox, then a sergeant in the REME, announced his  retirement but he was dissuaded by his coach, Ron Bright, and remained in the sport for another eight years. During that period he set a fine example to the tyros of the sport and following his final individual effort at the 1972 Olympics he won a team gold medal in Modern Pentathlon at the 1976 Summer Olympics in Montreal, with Danny Nightingale and Adrian Parker.

Fox, who was later commissioned as a captain in the REME, was first awarded the MBE and subsequently the OBE for his services to the sport.

References

External links

1941 births
Living people
British male modern pentathletes
Olympic modern pentathletes of Great Britain
Modern pentathletes at the 1964 Summer Olympics
Modern pentathletes at the 1968 Summer Olympics
Modern pentathletes at the 1972 Summer Olympics
Modern pentathletes at the 1976 Summer Olympics
Olympic gold medallists for Great Britain
English Olympic medallists
Olympic medalists in modern pentathlon
Royal Electrical and Mechanical Engineers officers
Medalists at the 1976 Summer Olympics
Officers of the Order of the British Empire